The AIDC T-5 Brave Eagle is a supersonic advanced jet trainer developed by the Aerospace Industrial Development Corporation (AIDC) of Taiwan.

Development

Advanced Jet Trainer Program 

The Advanced Jet Trainer Program (AJT) began in the early 2000s as the Republic of China Air Force sought a replacement for its fleet of AIDC AT-3 and Northrop F-5 advanced trainers with 66 newly built aircraft. Three designs were proposed, a modernized, upgraded version of AT-3 branded as the AT-3 MAX, an evolution of the AIDC F-CK-1 Ching-Kuo combat aircraft to be called the XAT-5, or the Italian Alenia Aermacchi M-346 Master. In 2014 AIDC signed a memorandum of understanding with Alenia Aermacchi to assemble the M-346 in Taiwan. The engines of all M-346 are assembled in Taiwan by International Turbine Engine Company (ITEC), a joint partnership of Honeywell and AIDC. The MOD also evaluated the South Korean KAI T-50 Golden Eagle aircraft.

In 2017 it was announced that the XAT-5 had won the tender with development and production to be undertaken by a partnership of AIDC and the National Chung-Shan Institute of Science and Technology with delivery scheduled to begin in 2026. Four prototypes are to be produced and the total program cost is projected to be TWD68.6 billion (US$2.2 billion).

Naming 

AIDC had used Blue Magpie, for the Taiwan blue magpie, as the project name. However in 2018 the Ministry of National Defense announced a contest to pick an official name for the aircraft. Taiwanese citizens were invited to submit a name with a short proposal with the winner receiving a NTD 30,000 prize. On 24 September 2019, the president Tsai Ing-wen officially named the new aircraft "Brave Eagle" (Yǒngyīng) during first prototype aircraft roll-out ceremony.

Production 

In 2017, the United States approved the export of components for 132 Honeywell/ITEC F124 engines for the XAT/AT-5. In 2018, AIDC announced that the first prototype would be rolled out in September 2019 with flight tests to start in June 2020. In 2019 Taiwan’s Ministry of National Defense testified to the country’s legislature that the maiden flight is scheduled for June 2020, small scale production is to start in November 2021, and mass production is scheduled to commence March 2023.

In September 2019 A1 A2 T1 T2 the first of four prototypes was rolled out by Taiwanese President Tsai Ing-wen.

In March 2021 AIDC announced that they had completed internal flight tests and that testing of the two prototypes and the two initial aircraft due to be delivered by the end of the year would be conducted by the Taiwanese Air Force from then on. A number of internal and operational test flights were completed in July 2021 from Taitung Air Base with some operations occurring over the pacific ocean.

The first production model T-5 had its first flight on October 21, 2021. The first production model has the serial number 11003.

Design 

The design is based on the AIDC F-CK-1 Ching-Kuo and shares the same engines, but will have 80% new components including a composite body. Compared to the F-CK-1, it will have more advanced avionics, increased fuel capacity, and will be a little larger. The aerofoil is slightly revised, with the wings being thicker than on the F-CK-1 in order to increase stability at low speed and low altitude, as well as to provide increased fuel storage. The ram air scoop of the F-CK-1 has been redesigned in partnership with the Eaton Corporation with two aluminum laser powder bed fusion printed parts replacing 22 original parts. Meggitt will supply the main wheels, carbon brakes and brake control systems as they do on the AT-3 and F-CK-1. Martin-Baker will provide the ejection seat systems. More than 55% of its components are made in Taiwan. It has been reported that the aircraft was designed from the beginning to serve dual peacetime training and wartime combat roles.

Avionics and sensors 

NCSIST is developing an airborne AESA radar for the T-5 Brave Eagle but private Taiwanese firm Tron Future Tech has also bid their gallium nitride based AESA for the program. In 2019 it was announced that Pyras Technology would supply the radar and communications antennas for the platform.

Variants 

In 2019 Jane’s reported that a light fighter AT-5 variant was planned to replace the Northrop F-5E/F Tiger II fleet.

Operators 

 
 Republic of China Air Force – 66 aircraft (planned)

Specifications

See also 

 Defense industry of Taiwan

References

External links 

 Global Security AT-5 AJT Advanced Jet Trainer - Yung Yin (Brave Eagle)

AIDC aircraft
Twinjets
Mid-wing aircraft
Aircraft first flown in 2020
2020s Taiwanese military trainer aircraft